The 2005 Monterey Sports Car Championships was the final race for the 2005 American Le Mans Series season held at Mazda Raceway Laguna Seca.  It took place on October 16, 2005.

This race saw the competition debut of the new Porsche RS Spyder, the first Porsche prototype in approximately seven years.

Official results

Class winners in bold.  Cars failing to complete 70% of winner's distance marked as Not Classified (NC).

Statistics
 Pole Position - #15 Zytek Engineering - 1:14.185
 Fastest Lap - #15 Zytek Engineering - 1:16.480
 Distance - 
 Average Speed -

External links
 

M
Monterey Sports Car Championships
2005 in sports in California